Anthidium syriacum is a species of bee in the family Megachilidae, the leaf-cutter, carder, or mason bees.

Synonyms
Synonyms for this species include:
Anthidium dalmaticum syriacum Pérez, 1913

References

syriacum
Insects described in 1895